Rossignol is a French word meaning nightingale, and may refer to:

People 
 Rossignols, a family of French cryptographers
 André Rossignol (fl. 1923–1928), French racing driver
 Bruno Rossignol (born 1958), French choral conductor and composer
 Dan Rossignol (fl. 2013), doctor and autism researcher
 Felix Rossignol (1920–1981), Canadian NHL ice hockey player
 Jean Antoine Rossignol (1759–1802), general of the French Revolutionary Wars
 Jim Rossignol (born July 1978), British computer games journalist, critic and other
 Jules Rossignol (fl. 1900), French fencer
 Laurence Rossignol (born 1957), French politician
 Michelle Rossignol (born 1940), Canadian film actress
 Philippe Lando Rossignol (fl. 1956–1957), soukous recording artist

Places 
 Lake Rossignol, a lake in south-western Nova Scotia, Canada
 Rossignol Wood, a forest north of Hebuterne, France

Other uses
 Rossignol ENT, an experimental automatic rifle
 Battle of Rossignol, a World War I battle near Trintigny, Belgium
 Le rossignol, an 1842 composition by Franz Liszt
 Le Rossignol, a 1914 opera by Igor Stravinsky
 Skis Rossignol, a French manufacturer of clothing and sports equipment

See also
 Rosignol, a village in Guyana
 Rossignola, a red Italian wine grape variety

French-language surnames